Sydney is an Australian rugby union team that competes in the National Rugby Championship (NRC). Formerly known as Sydney Rays, the team is one of two sides from New South Wales in the competition; the other being the NSW Country Eagles.

The current team plays as the all-of-Sydney side in the NRC and wears the traditional blue and yellow colours of Sydney's representative rugby teams. It draws on the metropolitan sides that have represented the city for more than a century. In 2019 the NRC side adopted as its logo the anchor insignia of the Sydney Rugby Union, which dates back to at least 1970.

The team was known as the North Harbour Rays before 2016. It was renamed Sydney during a consolidation which reduced the number of NRC teams in the city from three in 2014 to eventually just one by 2018. The North Harbour Rays had been formed as consortium of four Sydney clubs; Gordon, Manly, Northern Suburbs, and Warringah in 2014.

North Harbour took its identity from the Central Coast Rays side that played in the earlier national competition, the Australian Rugby Championship (ARC) in 2007. It had been backed by the same four Sydney clubs, along with the Central Coast Waves.

Team colours
The Sydney team plays in a blue jersey with two yellow hoops on the chest that is based on the traditional design worn by Sydney representative teams for many years. The blue and yellow colours were adopted in 2018, and are the colours featured on the City of Sydney coat of arms.

For the ARC in 2007, the Central Coast Rays played in a predominantly green and blue jersey. From 2014 to 2017, the North Harbour Rays team wore harlequin-style quartered strips in the various colours of its four constituent clubs.

History
In 2007, an attempt was made to form a third tier of rugby in Australia, similar to New Zealand's ITM Cup and South Africa's Currie Cup. The newly formed competition included eight teams and was called the Australian Rugby Championship. Three of those teams were based in New South Wales, including a Central Coast team.

Central Coast: ARC

The Central Coast Rays team was officially launched in March 2007 by the New South Wales Rugby Union (NSWRU). The Rays' emerald and navy colours represented the ocean and bush landscape of the region. The team logo featured a manta ray in navy blue, outlined in white, on a stylised emerald green and white rugby ball.

The Rays' local rivals in the ARC were the Sydney Fleet and the Western Sydney Rams. The three ARC teams from New South Wales were aligned with existing clubs and regions. The clubs aligned with the Central Coast Rays were Gordon, Manly, Northern Suburbs, and Warringah, from the Shute Shield competition, as well as the Central Coast Waves.

The Central Coast Rays played their home games at the Bluetongue Central Coast Stadium at Gosford, on the New South Wales Central Coast. Bluetongue Stadium, with an all-seater capacity of 20,159, had previously hosted numerous rugby union fixtures including Central Coast Waves matches and New South Wales Waratahs matches during the Australian Provincial Championship.

John McKee was the head coach of the Central Coast team. He had previously coached the Eastwood club and worked with French club Montferrand and Irish team Connacht.

After finishing second on the league table, the Central Coast Rays came from behind against the Perth Spirit in their semi-final, winning 27 to 19. The Rays hosted the Melbourne Rebels in the inaugural ARC Grand Final and won 20 to 12, becoming the inaugural (and only) champions of the ARC.

The Australian Rugby Championship was terminated at the end of 2007 after only one season of competition, with the Australian Rugby Union citing higher costs than budgeted and further projected financial losses. The Central Coast Rays team was disbanded at the end of the ARC.

North Harbour
The National Rugby Championship was announced in December 2013 to commence in 2014 with expressions of interest open to any interested parties and the accepted bids decided early in 2014.

In March 2014 it was announced that the Rays would be revived as the North Harbour Rays to compete in the new National Rugby Championship. The new Rays team was backed by a consortium of the same four Shute Shield clubs involved in earlier Central Coast Rays team: Manly, Warringah, Northern Suburbs and Gordon.

The team played in a quartered harlequin-style strip composed of blue, red, and two shades of green from the four constituent clubs. The sleeves were gold and black, collar and shorts were white and all four clubs’ colours were featured on the socks.

The Rays secured Macquarie University as their principal partner on a two-year deal, to be officially be known as the Macquarie University North Harbour Rays for the 2014 and 2015 NRC seasons.

Phil Blake was initially appointed as the Rays head coach for the 2014 season, with Scott Fava, Haig Sare and Geoff Townsend as part of the coaching staff, but after Blake accepted a coaching opportunity with Leicester Tigers, Geoff Townsend was promoted to the head coaching position,  Damien Cummins replaced Fava as the forwards coach in 2014, and Greg Peterson was named as captain. In 2015, Townsend was reappointed as head coach, and Luke Holmes was named as captain.

Sydney
The team was renamed the Sydney Rays for the 2016 season. Southern Districts considered switching allegiance to the Rays in 2016, but remained with the Rams. Damien Cummins was initially named as head coach in 2016 but he stepped down and Simon Cron was appointed to the job.  The Rays performed well that year and lost only once in the regular season – to eventual minor premiers NSW Country – before being knocked out in a semi-final by the Perth Spirit, who went on to win the NRC title.

Two wooden spoon seasons followed in 2017 and 2018 under, respectively, Julian Huxley and Chris Whitaker. The Rays' moniker and logo were dropped in 2019, a year after New South Wales Rugby had taken control of the Sydney team. Whitaker was reappointed head coach and Sydney adopted the traditional masoned crown and anchor insignia of the Sydney Rugby Union for the NRC team's logo, although the anchor had  been used on the plaquet of the collar and in promotional material the year before. The Sydney Fleet ARC team had a similar crest in 2007.

Home grounds

, Sydney play their home matches at Woollahra Oval No.1. The team has its training base at the University of NSW in Sydney's eastern suburbs, the same facility used by the Waratahs.

From 2014 to 2017, the team played at several venues north of the harbour including Macquarie University and Brookvale Oval, as well as the home grounds of three of the four clubs from the Ray's ownership consortium at the time: Northern Suburbs, Manly and Warringah  (i.e. at North Sydney Oval, Manly Oval and Pittwater Park, respectively). In 2018, the Sydney Rays played south of the harbour at Concord, Leichhardt and Woollahra.

For the ARC in 2007, the Rays played at Bluetongue Central Coast Stadium.

Supporters
With the reemergence of the competition in the form of the NRC, fans from Manly and Warringah rugby heartland - tragic supporters of the game - formed the 'STRAYS'. In the spirit of rugby and the NRC they came together to make sure the new club had support in the local community and to 'enrich the sideline experience'. Its members were drawn to the common cause by the founder, Michael Gordon.

Current squad
The squad for the 2019 NRC season:
</onlyinclude>

Records

Honours
National Rugby Championship
Playoff appearances: 2016
Australian Rugby Championship
Champions: 2007

Season standings
National Rugby Championship
{| class="wikitable" style="text-align:center;"
|- border=1 cellpadding=5 cellspacing=0
! style="width:20px;"|Year
! style="width:20px;"|Pos
! style="width:20px;"|Pld
! style="width:20px;"|W
! style="width:20px;"|D
! style="width:20px;"|L
! style="width:20px;"|F
! style="width:20px;"|A
! style="width:25px;"|+/-
! style="width:20px;"|BP
! style="width:20px;"|Pts
! style="width:25em; text-align:left;"|  Play-offs
|-
|2018
|8th
| 7 || 0 || 0 || 7 || 167 || 364 || −197 || 1 || 1
|align=left|  Did not compete
|-
|2017
|8th
| 8 || 3 || 0 || 5 || 238 || 322 || –84 || 1 || 13
|align=left|  Did not compete
|-
|2016
|2nd
| 7 || 6 || 0 || 1 || 258 || 174 || +84 || 3 || 27
|align=left|  Lost semifinal by 24–42 to Perth Spirit
|-
|2015
|7th
| 8 || 2 || 0 || 6 || 275 || 339 || −64 || 3 || 11
|align=left|  Did not compete
|-
|2014
|7th
| 8 || 2 || 2 || 4 || 240 || 327 || −87 || 0 || 12 
|align=left|  Did not compete
|}

Australian Rugby Championship
{| class="wikitable" style="text-align:center;"
|- border=1 cellpadding=5 cellspacing=0
! style="width:20px;"|Year
! style="width:20px;"|Pos
! style="width:20px;"|Pld
! style="width:20px;"|W
! style="width:20px;"|D
! style="width:20px;"|L
! style="width:20px;"|F
! style="width:20px;"|A
! style="width:25px;"|+/-
! style="width:20px;"|BP
! style="width:20px;"|Pts
! style="width:25em; text-align:left;"|  Play-offs
|-
|2007
|2nd
| 8 || 5 || 0 || 3 || 268 || 159 || 109 || 6 || 26 
|align=left|  Champions
|}

Head coaches
 Chris Whitaker (2018–present)
 Julian Huxley (2017)
 Simon Cron (2016)
 Geoff Townsend (2014–15)
 John McKee (2007)

Captains
 Lalakai Foketi (2019)
 Damien Fitzpatrick (2017–2018)
 Matt Lucas (2016)
 Luke Holmes (2015)
 Greg Peterson (2014)
 Cameron Treloar (2007)

Squads
{| class="collapsible collapsed" style=" width: 100%; margin: 0px; border: 1px solid darkgray; border-spacing: 3px;"
|-
! colspan="10" style="background-color:#f2f2f2; cell-border:2px solid black; padding-left: 1em; padding-right: 1em; text-align: center;" |2016 Sydney Rays squad – NRC
|-
| colspan="10"| The following players were named in the Sydney Rays' squad for the 2016 National Rugby Championship:
|-
| width="3%"| 
| width="30%" style="font-size: 95%;" valign="top"|

Props
 Lawrence Hunting
 Ezra Luxton
 Rory O'Connor
 Angus Ta'avao

Hookers
 Damien Fitzpatrick
 James Hilterbrand

Locks
 James Brown
 Adrian Hall
 Nick Palmer
 Angus Ryan

| width="3%"| 
| width="30%" style="font-size: 95%;" valign="top"|

Loose Forwards
 Harry Bergelin
 Jack Dempsey
 Michael Hooper1
 Will Miller
 Hugh Sinclair
 Michael Smith
 Michael Wells

Scrum-halves 
 Michael Dowsett
 Matt Lucas (c)
 Dewett Roos

Fly-halves
 Sam Lane
 Angus Sinclair

| width="3%"| 
| width="30%" style="font-size: 95%;" valign="top"|

Centres
 Harry Jones
 Dennis Pili-Gaitau
 Irae Simone
 Seb Wileman

Wingers
 Tyson Davis
 Con Foley
 Rob Horne1
 Jonathan Malo
 Richard Woolf

Fullbacks
 Cameron Clark
 Josh Turner

(c) Team captainBold denotes internationally capped players at the time1 Allocated national player additional to contracted squad.
|}

{| class="collapsible collapsed" style=" width: 100%; margin: 0px; border: 1px solid darkgray; border-spacing: 3px;"
|-
! colspan="10" style="background-color:#f2f2f2; cell-border:2px solid black; padding-left: 1em; padding-right: 1em; text-align: center;" |2015 North Harbour Rays squad – NRC
|-
| colspan="10"| The following players were named in the North Harbour Rays' squad for the 2015 National Rugby Championship:
|-
| width="3%"| 
| width="30%" style="font-size: 95%;" valign="top"|

Props
 Wayne Borsak
 Mitch Lewis
 Lawrence Hunting
 Alexander Northam
 Rory O'Connor
 Scott Sio

Hookers
 Vance Elloitt
 James Hilterbrand
 Luke Holmes (c)
 James Wilkinson

Locks
 Ed Gower
 Richard Hooper
 Nick Palmer
 Harry Rorke
 Cameron Treloar
 Ruairidh Wilson

| width="3%"| 
| width="30%" style="font-size: 95%;" valign="top"|

Loose Forwards
 Harry Bergelin
 Jack Dempsey
 Michael Hooper1
 Mark Johnson
 Boyd Killingworth
 Sam Ward

Scrum-halves 
 Tim Donlan
 Tim Duchene
 Josh Holmes

Fly-halves
 Hamish Angus
 Sam Lane

| width="3%"| 
| width="30%" style="font-size: 95%;" valign="top"|

Centres
 John Fakai
 Tom Hill
 Dennis Pili-Gaitau
 John Porch

Wingers
 Michael Adams
 Sione 'Ala
 Tyson Davis
 Alex Northam
 Richard Woolf

Fullbacks
 Dave Feltscheer
 Reece Hodge

(c) Team captainBold denotes internationally capped players at the time1 Allocated national player additional to contracted squad.
|}

{| class="collapsible collapsed" style=" width: 100%; margin: 0px; border: 1px solid darkgray; border-spacing: 3px;"
|-
! colspan="10" style="background-color:#f2f2f2; cell-border:2px solid black; padding-left: 1em; padding-right: 1em; text-align: center;" |2014 North Harbour Rays squad – NRC
|-
| colspan="10"| The following players were named in the North Harbour Rays' squad for the 2014 National Rugby Championship:

|-
| width="3%"| 
| width="30%" style="font-size: 95%;" valign="top"|

Props
 Leeroy Atalifo
 Nick Fraser
 Kevin McNamara
 Dane Maraki
 Rory O'Connor
 Mitch Lewis

Hookers
 Luke Holmes
 David Porecki

Locks
 Scott Fardy1
 Ed Gower
 Ryan Melrose
 Greg Peterson (c)

| width="3%"| 
| width="30%" style="font-size: 95%;" valign="top"|

Loose Forwards
 Kotoni Ale
 Harry Bergelin
 James Cunningham
 Jack Dempsey
 Michael Hooper1
 Boyd Killingworth
 Wycliff Palu1
 Sam Ward
 Michael Wells

Scrum-halves 
 Josh Holmes
 Terry Preston
 Matt Lucas

Fly-halves
 Hamish Angus
 Scott Daruda
 Sam VaeVae

| width="3%"| 
| width="30%" style="font-size: 95%;" valign="top"|

Centres
 Jac Cameron
 Mali Hingano
 Tom Matthews
 Brian Sefanaia

Wingers
 Michael Adams
 Harry Jones
 Sireli Tagicakibau

Fullbacks
 Cam Crawford
 David Feltscheer

(c) Team captainBold denotes internationally capped players at the time1 Allocated national player additional to contracted squad.
|}

{| class="collapsible collapsed" style=" width: 100%; margin: 0px; border: 1px solid darkgray; border-spacing: 3px;"
|-
! colspan="10" style="background-color:#f2f2f2; cell-border:2px solid black; padding-left: 1em; padding-right: 1em; text-align: center;" |2007 Central Coast Rays squad – ARC
|-
| width="3%"| 
| width="30%" style="font-size: 95%;" valign="top"|

Props
 Al Baxter
 Ofa Fainga’anuku
 Nick Lah
 Rod Moore
 Aaron Tawera

Hookers
 Alex Gluth
 Al Manning 
 Dustin McGregor

Locks
 John Adams
 Nifo Nifo
 Chris Thompson
 Cameron Treloar

| width="3%"| 
| width="30%" style="font-size: 95%;" valign="top"|

Loose Forwards
 Ross Duncan
 Steve Evans
 Jared Waerea-Hargreaves
 Jason Peseta
 Wycliff Palu
 Vili Ratu
 Beau Robinson
 Dylan Sigg

Scrum-halves
 Brett Sheehan

Fly-halves
 Clint Eadie
 David Harvey  
 Sam Norton-Knight

| width="3%"| 
| width="30%" style="font-size: 95%;" valign="top"|

Centres
 Sam Harris
 Ben Jacobs

Wings
 Jordan Macey
 Pat McCabe
 Jye Mullane
 Andrew Smith

Fullbacks
 Peter Hewat

(c) Team captainBold denotes internationally capped players at the time
|}

Gallery

See also

 New South Wales Waratahs
 Shute Shield
 Gordon RFC
 Manly RUFC
 Northern Suburbs Rugby Club
 Warringah Rugby Club

References

External links

National Rugby Championship
Sport on the Central Coast (New South Wales)
Rugby clubs established in 2007
2007 establishments in Australia
Rugby union teams in New South Wales
Sports team relocations
Rugby union teams in Sydney
Northern Beaches
Rugby union clubs disestablished in 2020
2020 disestablishments in Australia